Thomas T. Moulton (January 1, 1896 – March 29, 1967) was an American sound engineer. He won five Academy Awards in the category Sound Recording and was nominated for eleven more in the same category. He was also nominated four times in the category Best Visual Effects.

Selected filmography
Moulton won five Academy Awards for Best Sound, was nominated for eleven more in the same category and four more for Best Visual Effects:

Won
 The Hurricane (1937)
 The Cowboy and the Lady (1938)
 The Snake Pit (1948)
 Twelve O'Clock High (1949)
 All About Eve (1950)

Nominated (Best Sound)
 The Affairs of Cellini (1934)
 The Dark Angel (1935)
 Dodsworth (1936)
 Gone with the Wind (1939)
 Our Town (1940)
 Ball of Fire (1941)
 The Pride of the Yankees (1942)
 The North Star (1943)
 Casanova Brown (1944)
 Leave Her to Heaven (1945)
 With a Song in My Heart (1952)

Nominated (Best Visual Effects)
 Foreign Correspondent (1940)
 The Long Voyage Home (1940)
 The Pride of the Yankees (1942)
 The North Star (1943)

References

External links

1896 births
1967 deaths
American audio engineers
Special effects people
People from Wausau, Wisconsin
Best Sound Mixing Academy Award winners
20th-century American engineers
Academy Award for Technical Achievement winners